President of the Senate of Zimbabwe is the presiding officer in the Senate of Zimbabwe.

Presidents of the Senate of Zimbabwe

See also
Senate of Rhodesia

References

Politics of Zimbabwe
Zimbabwe
1980 establishments in Zimbabwe
Presidents of the Senate of Zimbabwe